Roberto Muñoz may refer to:
 Roberto Rodríguez (baseball), Roberto Muñoz Rodríguez, Venezuelan baseball player
 Roberto Muñoz (cyclist) (born 1955), Chilean cyclist
 Bobby Muñoz, Puerto Rican baseball player
 Roberto Muñoz (producer)